Ram It Down is the eleventh studio album by English heavy metal band Judas Priest, released on 13 May 1988 by Columbia Records. It was the band's last album to feature longtime drummer Dave Holland, and was promoted in Europe and North America with the Mercenaries of Metal Tour.

On 18 July 1988, the album earned gold certification for shipments of over 500,000 copies. In 2001, it was remastered and reissued with two bonus tracks.

Background
In 1986, Judas Priest intended to release a double album entitled Twin Turbos, of which half would consist of melodic, more commercial hard rock, and the other half would be heavier and less synth-driven. Columbia Records objected to the double album concept, and the project was ultimately split into two separate releases, 1986's Turbo, and 1988's Ram It Down. At least four songs, "Ram it Down", "Hard as Iron", "Love You to Death" and "Monsters of Rock", were written for the Twin Turbos project.

Ram It Down would be the final Judas Priest album for 30 years recorded with producer Tom Allom. Allom would later return as co-producer to the 2009 live release A Touch of Evil: Live. He would not produce another Judas Priest studio album until 2018's Firepower.

The band recorded a rendition of Chuck Berry's "Johnny B. Goode", intended for inclusion on the soundtrack for the 1988 Anthony Michael Hall comedy film Johnny Be Good; the song found its way onto Ram It Down and was the album's first single. Although the song is credited as written by Berry and arranged by the band, only the lyrics remain from Berry's version, the music being entirely new. It was played during the first few concerts of the band's 1988 tour, along with the title track and three other songs from the album, namely "Heavy Metal", "Come And Get It" and "I'm a Rocker". The only Ram It Down songs to have ever been played on later tours are "I'm a Rocker", during the 2005 Retribution Tour; and "Blood Red Skies" during the 2011-2012 Epitaph World Tour and the 2021-2022 50 Heavy Metal Years Tour.

Originally, the song "Thunder Road" was to be put on the album; however, after the album producers were asked to do the cover of "Johnny B. Goode", "Thunder Road" was replaced. Some of the parts from the song made it into the cover of "Johnny B. Goode". "Thunder Road" was released as a bonus track on the 2001 remaster of Point of Entry.

Although Judas Priest's fanbase was big enough to push the album to gold status in North America, critical reaction was fairly negative, arguing that the band failed to produce any new creative ideas, and the songwriting was inferior to their past efforts.

Halford's take on the rest of the album is that it was "a very heavy record", with Glenn Tipton and K. K. Downing "really rip[ping] it up on a lot of those riffs". Halford said the band recorded a cover of the Rolling Stones' "Play with Fire"; he said it was "a shame" that the song did not make the album.

Track listing

Personnel
Judas Priest
Rob Halford – lead vocals
K. K. Downing – guitars
Glenn Tipton – guitars, synthesizers
Ian Hill – bass guitar
Dave Holland – drums, drum machine

Production
Produced by Tom Allom
"Johnny B. Goode" co-produced by Glenn Tipton, Rob Halford, and K. K. Downing
Engineered by Henrik Nilsson
Additional recording by Bill Dooley
Equipment supervision by Tom Calcaterra
Artwork by Mark Wilkinson

Charts

Certifications

Other information
An unknown song was recorded for inclusion on the album but the tape was lost during a chaotic period which resulted from Halford's decision to leave the band following the group's next album, Painkiller, and Tim "Ripper" Owens' hiring as his replacement. For this reason Ram It Down is the only remastered Judas Priest disc with no added bonus studio tracks, just two added live tracks.
The song "Blood Red Skies" was released as a promo only single with a 4:51 radio edit, the album version and a 10:33 extended remix.
Although drummer Dave Holland is credited on the album, the band used a drum machine on a majority of the songs. 
The band recorded three tracks with pop producers Stock-Aitken-Waterman – two originals "Runaround" and "I Will Return" and a cover of The Stylistics' hit "You Are Everything. However, they were ultimately not included on this album due to a management decision. Pete Waterman calls them "probably the best tracks we ever did" and admits that "I occasionally dig the record out and play it to people, and they're amazed that we made heavy metal." Around this time, Glenn Tipton also recorded guitar solos for songs by another Stock-Aitken-Waterman produced artist, Samantha Fox, and was officially credited on the track "Spirit of America".

References

1988 albums
Albums produced by Tom Allom
Columbia Records albums
Judas Priest albums